is a Japanese pianist, music educator, composer, and ethnomusicologist.

Biography
She was born in Japan and studied music at the Toho Gakuen School of Music and the University of Tokyo. After completing her education, she took a position teaching music at Toho Gakuen.

Works
Masumoto composes music for chamber ensemble, opera and voice performance. Selected compositions include:
Pastorale for solo recorder 
Archaic Phrase for solo Chang harp
Tapestry for solo harpsichord
Ranjoh for solo flute

References

External links
  

1937 births
20th-century classical composers
20th-century Japanese musicians
21st-century classical composers
21st-century Japanese musicians
Japanese classical composers
Japanese women classical composers
Japanese opera composers
Japanese music educators
Japanese ethnomusicologists
Living people
20th-century Japanese educators
21st-century Japanese educators
Women music educators
20th-century women composers
21st-century women composers
20th-century women educators
21st-century women educators
21st-century Japanese women musicians